The following is a list of national American television networks and announcers that have broadcast the Breeders' Cup.

Television

2020s

2010s

2000s

1990s

1980s

References

External links
Crist: Breeders' Cup's return to NBC can only help

Lists of horse racing writers and broadcasters
ABC Sports
NBC Sports
NBCSN
Breeders Cup
ESPN2
Lists of announcers of American sports events
American horse racing announcers